Quercus pumila, the runner oak or running oak, is a species of oak. It is native to the southeastern United States (Mississippi, Alabama, Florida, Georgia, and the Carolinas).

The bark is gray or dark brown.

References

External links
Discover Life
Luna Imaging

pumila
Flora of the Southeastern United States
Plants described in 1790